Oedemera atrata is a species of beetle belonging to the family Oedemeridae subfamily Oedemerinae.

These beetles are present in Albania, Croatia, France, Italy, Greece, Spain and in the Near East.

They are entirely black or very dark green or dark purple.

References
 
 Vazquez, X. A. 2002. European Fauna of Oedemeridae - Argania editio, Barcelona, 179 pp.

Oedemeridae
Beetles of Asia
Beetles of Europe
Beetles described in 1846